Coole Upper Churches are medieval churches forming a National Monument in County Cork, Ireland.

Location

History
This area is associated with two saints, Abbán and Dalbach.

The church at Coole Upper is the larger and was built in the 12th century as a single nave church and had antae.

The chancel was added in the 13th century. It has a narrow two-light ogee window in the east gable. A rosette was carved on one of the stones in the east wall.

References

Religion in County Cork
Archaeological sites in County Cork
National Monuments in County Cork
Former churches in the Republic of Ireland